Jim Frazier may refer to:

 Jim Frazier (American football) (born c. 1941), American football coach
 Jim Frazier (inventor) (1940–2022), Australian inventor, naturalist and cinematographer 
 Jim Frazier (politician) (born 1959), American politician

See also 
 James Frazier (disambiguation)